After the death of Ali Mohammed Khan Rohilla in 1748, the region of Rohilkhand split into numerous independent chieftaincies. The most powerful chiefs among the Rohillas were Hafiz Rahmat Khan, Najib ad-Dawlah, Faizullah Khan, Ali Mohammed Khan and Dundy Khan. In 1772 the total force of the Rohilla leaders was estimated at 80,000 cavalry and infantry. But the independence of each chief rendered it very difficult to effect a union of military power. Due to this division and lack of unity, Rohilla chieftaincies fell to joint forces of Awadh and East India Company one by one in 1774. Rohilla chiefs like Zabita Khan and Faizullah Khan did not lose their lands.

References

Indian people of Pashtun descent
Rohilla